Money Flower is a South Korean television series starring Jang Hyuk, Park Se-young and Jang Seung-jo. It aired every Saturday from 11th Nov 2017 on MBC from 8:45 p.m. to 11:00 p.m. (KST), 2 episodes a day. It tells the story of people who are driven by the illusion that they can control money, but in fact they are the ones being dominated by greed.

Synopsis
Kang Pil-joo (Jang Hyuk) is envied by many inside the Cheong-A Group, where he enjoys the esteem and respect of the Honorary Chairman. Keeping his real identity a secret from the Cheong-A Group founding family, he has served as their loyal servant from his teens, part of a plot to avenge his family and a tragic childhood. He plots to have Na Mo-hyun (Park Se-young) fall in love with young Cheong-A Group scion Jang Boo-cheon (Jang Seung-jo), but he finds himself falling in love with her free-spirited personality. "Money Flower" portrays how the lives of Pil-joo, Mo-hyun, who seeks love, and Boo-cheon, Pil-joo's "master" and companion are intertwined by fate and design. Their fates are pulled into a vortex of greed, power, desire and love.

Cast

Main cast 
Jang Hyuk as Kang Pil-joo / Jang Eun-cheon / Jo In-ho (37) : Managing Director and attorney at Cheong-A Group
Nam Ki-won as young Kang Pil-joo
Jo Byeong-kyu as teen Kang Pil-joo
Park Se-young as Na Mo-hyun (35) : Environmental activist and a substitute science teacher. Won gold in swimming in Korea National Games
Kim Ji-min as teen Na Mo-hyun
Jang Seung-jo as Jang Boo-cheon (37) : Scion of Cheong-A Group fortune and son of Jung Mal-ran
Chae Sang-woo as teen Jang Boo-cheon
Lee Mi-sook as Jung Mal-ran (59): eldest daughter-in-law of Jang Kook-hwan, Cheong-A Foundation director
Lee Soon-jae as Jang Kook-hwan (89): founder of Cheong-A corporation
Han So-hee as Yoon Seo-won (35): secret lover of Jang Boo-cheon, former information desk employee at Cheong-A group office headquarters

Supporting cast

Jang household
Moon Yoo-bin as Jang Yeon-woo (32): younger sister of Jang Boo-cheon, second year resident surgeon
Sunwoo Jae-duk as Jang Sung-man (60): second son of Jang Kook-hwan
Shin Young-jin as Park Sun-kyung (56): wife of Jang Sung-man
Im Kang-sung as Jang Yeo-cheon (36): son of Jang Sung-man 
Yoon Sun-young as Lee Hyun-joo (35): wife of Jang Yeo-cheon, daughter of Hanmin Daily's chairman
Lee Hang-na as Han Eun Shim (49): live-in partner of Jang Kook-hwan
Hong Dong-yeong as Jang Ha-jung (5): son of Jang Boo-cheon and Yoon Seo-won   
Jeon Hae-sol as Jang Ha-yoon (5): son of Jang Yeo-cheon and Lee Hyun-joo
Han Dong-hwan as Jang Soo-man (deceased): eldest son of Jang Kook-hwan

Na household
Park Ji-il as Na Gi-chul (60): father of Na Mo-hyun, presidential elect candidate
Chu Kwi-jang as Bae Jum-sun (57): mother of Na Mo-hyun, restaurant owner
Dan Woo as Na Doo-hyun (28): younger brother of Na Mo-hyun

Others
Ryu Dam as Park Yong-goo (30): good friend of Kang Pil-joo
 Park Jung-hak as Oh Ki-pyung (62): chauffeur of Jung Mal-ran
 Hong Gyung-yun as Go Eun-A (58) : main cook of the Jang family
 Kwon Hyuk as Yang Sang-do (45) : aide of Na Gi-chul
 Kim Ji-sung as Ahn Hee-young (39) : secretary of Jung Mal-ran
 Jeon Jin-ki as Woo Chang-sun (60) : chief of planning department in Cheong-A group
 Hong Hee-won as Ha Yung-do (40) : prosecutor
 Park Sun-woo as Bae Kang-choon (45) : gangster
 Jung Seo-yeon as Ahn Ho-Kyung : mother of Kang Pil-joo

Reception 
Viewership ratings for 'Money Flower' started with a modest 10.3% (based on AGB Nielson National) for its first episode. Despite the little promotion it got initially, the ratings rose steadily as it was aired due to the good reviews spread by word-of-mouth, setting high records for itself almost every week to cross the 20% mark by its 20th episode. The media labelled it as a 'masterpiece' and 'well-made drama' with its engaging plot, excellent directing, beautiful background music and the stellar performances of its cast. It was ranked first among TV dramas in the same time slot for 10 consecutive weeks since it started.

Original soundtrack

Part 1

Part 2

Part 3

Part 4

Part 5

Ratings 
 In the table below,  represent the lowest ratings and  represent the highest ratings. 
 N/A denotes that the rating is not known.

Awards and nominations

International Broadcast
 Money Flower airs in Singapore, Malaysia, Hong Kong, Indonesia and Brunei on Oh!K beginning 30 Jan 2018.
 Money Flower airs in Japan on KNTV beginning 17 March 2018.
 Money Flower airs in Taiwan on EBC beginning 12 July 2018.
 Money Flower airs in Peru on Willax TV beginning 9 July 2018
 Money Flower airs on Netflix since 2018

Notes

References

External links
  

Korean-language television shows
2017 South Korean television series debuts
2018 South Korean television series endings
MBC TV television dramas